In cricket, an umpire is a person who has the authority to make judgements on the field. There are two on-field umpires, who apply the laws, make all necessary decisions, and relay the decisions to the scorers.

The Indian Premier League (IPL) is a professional league for Twenty20 cricket in India, which has been held annually since its first season in 2008. In the fourteen seasons of the league, 54 umpires have officiated at least one IPL match. Of these, Sundaram Ravi has officiated the most matches, serving as an umpire 122 times, while Subroto Das has officiated the fewest, serving in one match of the 2013 season. The first match of the IPL, played between the Royal Challengers Bangalore and Kolkata Knight Riders, was umpired by Asad Rauf and Rudi Koertzen. 29 of the umpires are of Indian nationality, seven are Australian, five are South African, four are from New Zealand, three umpires are from England, two from each of Pakistan and Sri Lanka and one umpire from each of West Indies and Zimbabwe. 13 umpires have served in only one season.

The list is initially organised by the number of matches as an umpire, and if the numbers are tied, the list is sorted by last name. This list is correct as of the end of the 2021 IPL season, and does not cover the games played by IPL teams in other tournaments or tours, such as the Champions League Twenty20, the British Asian Cup or the 2008 Kolkata Knight Riders tour of Australia.

IPL umpires

See also
International Panel of Umpires and Referees

Notes

References

Umpires
Umpires
Indian cricket in the 21st century

Indian Premier League lists